Principles for Responsible Investment (UNPRI or PRI) is a United Nations-supported international network of financial institutions working together to implement its six aspirational principles, often referenced as "the Principles". Its goal is to understand the implications of sustainability for investors and support signatories to facilitate incorporating these issues into their investment decision-making and ownership practices. In implementing these principles, signatories contribute to the development of a more sustainable global financial system.

The Principles offer a framework of possible actions for incorporating environmental, social and corporate governance factors into investment practices across asset classes. Responsible investment is a process that must be tailored to fit each organisation's investment strategy, approach and resources. The Principles are designed to be compatible with the investment styles of large, diversified, institutional investors that operate within a traditional fiduciary framework.

As of March 2022, more than 4,800 signatories from over 80 countries representing approximately US$100 trillion have signed up to the Principles. 
In some cases, before retaining an investment manager, institutional investors will inquire as to whether the manager is a signatory.

Overview

About the PRI
In early 2005, the then UN Secretary-General, Kofi Annan, invited a group of the world’s largest institutional investors to join a process to develop the Principles for Responsible Investment. A 20-person investor group drawn from institutions in 12 countries was supported by a 70-person group of experts from the investment industry, intergovernmental organisations and civil society. The Principles were launched in April 2006 at the New York Stock Exchange.

The Principles are based on the notion that environmental, social and governance (ESG) issues, such as climate change and human rights, can affect the performance of investment portfolios and should therefore be considered alongside more traditional financial factors if investors are to properly fulfill their fiduciary duty. The six Principles provide a global framework for mainstream investors to consider these ESG issues.

The PRI was created alongside the Principles to help put the framework into practice.

The Principles saw increased sign-up following the global financial crisis of 2008–2009, according to a report in the Financial Times.

The Principles are ‘voluntary and aspirational’ and they do not have minimum entry requirements or absolute performance standards for responsible investment. However, signatories have an obligation to report on the extent to which they implement the Principles through the annual Reporting and Assessment process.

The PRI has around 200 staff based mostly in London, with offices in New York City, Seoul, Sao Paulo, Amsterdam, Tokyo and Cape Town.

The Principles for Responsible Investment
The six principles are as follows:

As institutional investors, we have a duty to act in the best long-term interests of our beneficiaries. In this fiduciary role, we believe that environmental, social, and corporate governance (ESG) issues can affect the performance of investment portfolios (to varying degrees across companies, sectors, regions, asset classes and through time). We also recognise that applying these principles may better align investors with broader objectives of society. Therefore, where consistent with our fiduciary responsibilities, we commit to the following:

1. We will incorporate ESG issues into investment analysis and decision-making processes.

2. We will be active owners and incorporate ESG issues into our ownership policies and practices.

3. We will seek appropriate disclosure on ESG issues by the entities in which we invest.

4. We will promote acceptance and implementation of the Principles within the investment industry.

5. We will work together to enhance our effectiveness in implementing the Principles.

6. We will each report on our activities and progress towards implementing the Principles.

Partnership initiatives
The PRI is a founding member of the United Nations Sustainable Stock Exchanges (SSE) initiative along with the United Nations Conference on Trade and Development (UNCTAD), the United Nations Environment Programme Finance Initiative (UNEP-FI), and the UN Global Compact.

Major projects

Fiduciary duty in the 21st century
A report published by the PRI (with UNEP FI, UNEP Inquiry and the UN Global Compact) found that fiduciary duty is not an obstacle to asset owner action on ESG factors. Fiduciary duty in the 21st century looked at fiduciary duty across eight markets (US, Canada, UK, Germany, Brazil, Australia, Japan and South Africa) through a series of events, interviews, case studies and a legal review.

Fiduciary duty has long been a contentious issue, especially in the US. Asset managers and advisers have often cited fiduciary duty as a reason for not incorporating ESG factors into the investment decision-making process, claiming that looking at non-financial indicators was not consistent with their fiduciary duty.

The report found that many investors have yet to fully integrate ESG issues into their investment decision making processes. Some of the reasons for this include outdated perceptions about fiduciary duty and long-term responsible investment.

ESG integration for equity investing
The PRI launched a guide to help investors - both asset owners and investment managers - who are implementing ESG integration techniques in their investment process. It is the most comprehensive description to date of what ESG-integrated analysis is, and how it works in practice.

The guide contains information and case studies on integration techniques that apply to investment strategies including fundamental, quantitative, smart beta and passive investment. It assists asset owners and investment managers with constructing ESG-integrated investment processes and helps asset owners to assess their managers' integration practices. A chapter on sell-side investment research maps out the types of ESG-integrated research available, and demonstrates brokers' integration techniques.

See also
UK company law and US corporate law
Corporate social responsibility
Institutional investor and Stewardship Code
Sustainable Asset Management (SAM)

References

External links
Official website
Video interviews conducted by the PRI
Homepage of UNEP FI
Homepage of UNGC
Principles for Responsible Investment

Ethical banking
Ethical investment